North Highland College provides further education and higher education in the north of Scotland through a network of learning centres and by distance learning. It is a constituent college of the University of the Highlands and Islands.

History 

The college opened in 1959 and became an independent entity in 1993.

In July 2014, the college had 8,000 students enrolled in full-time and part-time courses, including more than 750 studying for university degrees.

The college has campuses in Thurso, Halkirk, Alness and Dornoch.

Thurso campus

Centre for Energy and Environment
The Centre for Energy and Environment building was designed by HRI Architects and completed in January 2011. It received a rating of excellent by BREEAM. and was awarded "best new building in the north region" at the Highlands and Islands Design Awards in 2012.

Rural studies centre 

The college has been offering equestrian courses since 1990. In September 2012 it has used a converted farm that combines stabling, classrooms and a purpose-built indoor arena. Dale Farm is a facility that is situated approximately six miles from the main campus in Thurso. The college also offers a gamekeeping and wildlife management course.

Environmental Research Institute 

Environmental Research Institute (ERI) is a centre for environmental research

Centre for History 

The centre in Dornoch opened in 2005. Since 2007 a number of degree courses have been offered that are centred on the history of the Highlands and Islands.

Governance 

The principal, Mrs Debbie Murray, took up the post in May 2021.

References

External links 
 North Highland College
 Environmental Research Institute

University of the Highlands and Islands
Education in Highland (council area)
Further education colleges in Scotland
Higher education colleges in Scotland
Thurso
1959 establishments in Scotland
Educational institutions established in 1959